Standard Missile refers to a family of American-made shipborne guided missiles:

 RIM-66 Standard (SM-1MR/SM-2MR), a medium-range surface-to-air missile, the successor of the RIM-24 Tartar surface-to-air missile, currently in use by the U.S. Navy and many other navies around the world
 RIM-67 Standard (SM-1ER/SM-2ER), an extended-range surface-to-air missile, the successor of the RIM-2 Terrier surface-to-air missile, withdrawn from service because it was too long to fit into vertical launching system equipped ships
 AGM-78 Standard ARM, a long-range air-launched anti-radiation missile used by the U.S. Navy and the U.S. Air Force during the War in Vietnam
 XAIM-97A Seekbat, a proposed long range air-to-air missile, based on the AGM-78, development was cancelled at the flight testing stage. 
  RIM-156A Standard, an extended-range surface-to-air missile, a VLS version of the RIM-67 Standard
 RIM-161 Standard Missile 3 (SM-3), a ship-launched anti-ballistic missile, originally based on the SM-2ER Block IV (RIM-156).
 RIM-174 Standard ERAM (SM-6), an upgraded version of the SM-2. It is designed to intercept both hostile aircraft and high-performance anti-ship missiles.